Bruce Olive (born 1930) is a former Indigenous Australian professional rugby league player who played as a prop forward for the Newtown Jets in the 1960s.

Wollongong prop played for New South Wales in nine matches between 1958-62 but could not break into the Australian Test side. Olive, who paved the way for Country’s upset wins over City in 1961-62, later played with Newtown in the mid-1960s.

References

1930 births
Living people
Australian rugby league players
Indigenous Australian rugby league players
Newtown Jets players
Country New South Wales rugby league team players
New South Wales rugby league team players
Rugby league props